"Making a Fire" is a song by American rock band Foo Fighters, the opening track on their tenth studio album, Medicine at Midnight (2021). It was released to rock radio stations on June 8, 2021, making it the album's fourth single.

Release 
Prior to the release of Medicine at Midnight, Foo Fighters shared a snippet of "Making a Fire", along with "Cloudspotter", on February 1, 2021. After the album's release, "Making a Fire" was included in the soundtrack for the baseball video game MLB The Show 21, released in April 2021. The song was released to rock-centric radio stations on June 8, 2021, making it the fourth single released from Medicine at Midnight. It became Foo Fighters' 11th song to reach number 1 on the Billboard Mainstream Rock Airplay chart. A re-recorded version of the song produced by Mark Ronson was released on June 25, 2021, featuring musicians from bands such as the Budos Band, Antibalas, and the Tedeschi Trucks Band.

Composition and themes 
According to insider.com, "The album kicks off with the jovial tune "Making a Fire", which boasts a funky 3/4 groove. The chorus is especially catchy thanks to a gospely "na-na-na" refrain with harmonies from some female vocalists including Grohl's daughter Violet." According to Rolling Stone, the song "Making a Fire" is "brighter and more optimistic than anything they’ve ever done".

Track listing

Charts

Original version

Weekly charts

Year-end charts

Mark Ronson Re-version

Weekly charts

Awards

References

2021 songs
Foo Fighters songs
RCA Records singles